Alberro is a surname. Notable people with the surname include:

Gabe Alberro (born 1976), American writer, songwriter, and filmmaker
José Alberro (born 1969), American baseball player

See also
Albero